Backwater was an American jazz fusion band formed in Mobile, Alabama, that was active in the 1970s.

The group was founded by Robby Catlin and Scott Pettersen, with Larry Hardin and Trippe Thomason completing the lineup. The quartet formed in 1975, playing clubs and working as session musicians in Birmingham, Alabama. The group's first album, Backwater (1976), sold well throughout the Southeast and received radio airplay, leading to touring with B.B. King, Bonnie Raitt, and Emmylou Harris. Lineup changes plagued the band for much of the rest of their career. Pettersen, Catlin, and Tom and Myra Woodruff produced one more album (North of the Mason-Dixon and the Heart of Dixie in 1978) before breaking up as the decade ended. The band's original members reunited for a concert in 1997.

History

Formation and debut album (early to mid 1970s)

In the early 1970s, Robby Catlin formed Backwater as a trio playing cover music. The Mobile, Alabama-based trio (with guitarist Bob Bishop) performed covers of top 40 singles and became staples of fraternity parties and high school dances. In 1975, childhood friends Larry Hardin and Catlin formed a band with Scott Pettersen, Steve Ferrell and Jim Reid (with whom Catlin had performed in junior high school as part of the band Free Will) along with high school friend Jim Henderson and Bishop. The band moved to Birmingham, Alabama, where they played cover music at The Morris House club. Ferrell, Bishop, Reid and Henderson left the band (some to return to college) and Catlin, Hardin and Pettersen met Trippe Thomason, who would be incorporated into the band as keyboardist in late 1975.

Guitarist Gerry Groom also joined the band in early 1976, but left following the recording of their debut. Groom, who had been a child prodigy that studied under and performed with Duane Allman, was instrumental in pushing the group into a more blues-based improvisational style and encouraged the band to find its own voice. Groom also introduced the group to John Hammond Jr., whom they backed in a 1975 concert. The group only owned one vehicle — a bread truck — and they lived together in a condemned home on the south side of the city. Eight months after forming, the band decided to record their first album. The band was largely inspired by artists such as Herbie Hancock, Weather Report, and Mahavishnu.

Rather than sign to a record label, Hardin, Pettersen, and Catlin formed their own independent label, Bongwater Records. According to the group, it was formed after receiving offers from labels who desired to change their sound. Bongwater Publishing Company was incorporated on September 2, 1976. The five musicians worked as session musicians at New London Recording in Homewood in exchange for studio time for themselves. The resulting self-titled album was released in September 1976 and contained a studio side and a live side recorded at the Birmingham nightclub The Midnight's Voice. Edgar Winter performed live with the band during recording (but was not recorded) and encouraged the band to go national.

The band mailed copies to radio stations across the country. The exposure helped Backwater land opening slots for B.B. King, Bonnie Raitt, and Emmylou Harris. The album was aired on radio stations in Mobile, Auburn, Tuscaloosa, Montgomery, New Orleans, and on WAPI-FM, WENN-FM and WERC-FM in Birmingham. Medusa and most of the other major record stores in Birmingham stocked the record alongside "artistically designed" tees. "Alto Ego" proved to be the biggest airplay hit, while "A Song for Don" also received rotation. "Southern popular music is often typecast as refried boogie produced by a faceless series of Allman Brothers clones," wrote A.J. Wright of The Auburn Plainsman. "Backwater will soon change that false image."

Lineup change, second record and breakup (late 1970s)
In 1977, Hardin and Thomason quit for "creative differences." Hardin later remarked, "We were full of ourselves [...] It was a matter of having too many kids with too many egos." Catlin and Pettersen forged ahead with a long series of replacement players (most notably Tom and Myra Woodruff) who helped cobble together another release, North of the Mason-Dixon and the Heart of Dixie (1978). The studio side of the release was recorded at Fifth Floor Recording Studios in Cincinnati, Ohio, during the Great Blizzard of 1978, while live tracks were recorded at both Mobile's Saenger Theatre and Solomon Alfred's Night Club in Memphis, Tennessee. The album also included a 7" EP, Punk Jazz, containing experimental songs. The album, like Backwater, sold well locally. The band continued to 1979 with new member Frank Garcia, playing a mix of John Coltrane, Herbie Hancock, Little Feat, and Billy Joel covers alongside originals and contemporary music.

As the decade closed, the band would eventually decide to part ways. "It got to the point where we were just another bar band," Pettersen recalled. "Our basic problem is that our sound is too diversified," Catlin said in a 1979 interview. "There is a recognizable style, but it's not real hip — to a record company — to go from a 1940's tune to a modern one. They don't quite know where to put us. They could put us in the funk category, but we're not quite enough commercial disco."

In 1997, the group's four principal members reunited for a concert at Mobile's Saenger Theatre, sponsored by radio host Catt Sirten. The band's debut album, Backwater, was remastered and released on compact disc the same year. Co-founder Robby Catlin died in 2006, while original drummer Scott Pettersen passed in 2021.

Band members
Former members
 Larry Hardin – alto, tenor, and baritone saxophones, clarinet, flute, percussion (1975–77; 1979; 1997)
 Robby Catlin – bass guitar, vocals (1975–78; 1997)
 Trippe Thomason – keyboards (1975–77; 1997)
 Scott Pettersen – drums,percussion (1975–78; 1997)
 Gerry Groom – guitar (1976)
 Tom Woodruff – keyboards (1977–1979)
 Nick Rayner – drums (1979)
 Frank Garcia – congas (1979)
 Myra Woodruff – backing vocals (1977–1979)

Discography
 Backwater (1976)
 North of the Mason-Dixon and the Heart of Dixie (1978)

References

External links
 

American jazz ensembles from Alabama
Jazz fusion ensembles
Smooth jazz ensembles
Musical groups established in 1975
1975 establishments in Alabama
1979 disestablishments in Alabama
Musical groups from Alabama